Chauri Chaura (Pargana: Haveli, Tehsil: Gorakhpur) is a town near Gorakhpur, Uttar Pradesh, India. The town is located at a distance of 16km from Gorakhpur, on the State Highway between Gorakhpur and Deoria. The town railway station is located 25 km south-east of Gorakhpur Junction.

In 1922, the Chauri Chaura incident took place in the town when protesters set fire to a police station and killed at least 22 policemen in retaliation to the police firing on several protesters who had taken part in the non-cooperation movement as part of the Indian freedom struggle. This incident is depicted in the movie Gandhi.

References 

Historic sites in India
Cities and towns in Gorakhpur district
History of Uttar Pradesh